Oxford University Rowing Clubs (OURCs) is a federation of the Oxford University Boat Club (OUBC), the Oxford University Women's Boat Club (OUWBC), the Oxford University Lightweight Rowing Club (OULRC), and the Oxford University Women's Lightweight Rowing Club (OUWLRC), as well as all college boat clubs. OURCs is a purely administrative organisation with no training or crews. It was created in 1986 in order to remove the organisational burden from the university squad and is responsible for organising inter-collegiate competitions and overseeing the conduct of college rowing. The student-led organisation of OURCs is supported by senior members of the university, the Council for Oxford University Rowing, which issues advice and deals with aspects of rowing safety.  A similar function is fulfilled by the Cambridge University Combined Boat Clubs for rowing clubs of the University of Cambridge.

Clubs

OURCs run events
Autumn Fours (Michaelmas Term)
Isis Winter League (Michaelmas and Hilary Term)
Torpids (Hilary Term)
Summer Eights (Trinity Term)

References

External links
 Oxford University Boat Club
 Oxford University Women's Boat Club
 Oxford University Women's Lightweight Rowing Club
 Oxford University Lightweight Rowing Club
 Oxford University Rowing Clubs